Oly Ilunga Kalenga (born 24 June 1960) is a Belgian–Congolese medical doctor who was the Democratic Republic of the Congo's Minister of Public Health from 2016 to 2019. He resigned his post on 22 July 2019, then was arrested on 14 September 2019 for allegedly mismanaging a portion of Congo's $4.3 million in Ebola response money, an allegation that he denies.

Early life and career in Belgium
Oly Ilunga Kalenga moved to Belgium aged 13. He studied medicine at the University of Namur and the University of Louvain (UCLouvain). His MD was followed by a PhD in public health and epidemiology and an MBA specialising in health economics at the Louvain School of Management of the UCLouvain in Louvain-la-Neuve. He worked at the Cliniques de l'Europe (Europe Hospitals) in Brussels, specialising in internal medicine and intensive care, rising to head the intensive care unit, and then became the hospital's medical director and managing director (2013–16).

Democratic Republic of the Congo
Ilunga Kalenga began consulting for the Democratic Republic of the Congo (DRC) health ministry in 2000 and was appointed DRC's Minister of Public Health in December 2016. After two-and-a-half years, on 22 July 2019, Kalenga resigned after his mandate was curtailed to only non-Ebola public-health matters, attributing his departure to the Congolese President Félix Tshisekedi's decision to oversee the DRC's Ebola response personally, and to his desire to avoid "creating confusion" and to avert the "inevitable...predictable [public] outcry" such a sharing of oversight entailed. Tshisekedi then appointed a team of experts, led by Jean-Jacques Muyembe-Tamfum, described by The Lancet as Africa's Ebola hunter, to direct the Congo's Ebola response.

His tenure as public health minister was marked by two outbreaks of Ebola virus disease in the country, in Équateur in May–July 2018 and in Kivu and Ituri from August 2018 (ongoing as of April 2020). Vaccination was key to the successful control of the Équateur outbreak, and Ilunga Kalenga stated that he was vaccinated "to show the vaccine's safety and break the stigma around it."

He also served on the board of the African Constituency Bureau (2018–20).

Selected publications

References

1960 births
Living people
People from Lubumbashi
Université de Namur alumni
Université catholique de Louvain alumni
Belgian intensivists
Government ministers of the Democratic Republic of the Congo
Health in the Democratic Republic of the Congo
Democratic Republic of the Congo medical researchers